Andriy Hlushchenko (born 18 March 1974) is a Ukrainian football goalkeeper coach at Chornomorets Odessa of the Ukrainian Premier League.

Career
He played at Torpedo Zaporizhia, Zirka Kirovohrad, Metalurh Zaporizhzhia, llychivets Mariupol and Chornomorets Odesa and was also a goalkeeper coach at Metalurh Zaporizhzhia.

Andriy announced his retirement as a professional goalkeeper in the spring of 2009. Altogether, he played in 226 games in the Ukrainian Premier League in which he allowed 323 goals with a 1.429 GAA (goals against average).

Hlushchenko then was a goalkeeper coach at Metalurh Zaporizhzhia in 2009–2011. After that, he joined Chornomorets Odesa in the same role on 24 Mar 2011, and was then also listed as a player for the 2011–12 season.

References

External links
Profile on Official Illychivets Website
Profile on Football Squads
Андрей ГЛУЩЕНКО: "Тяжело расставаться с Запорожьем"

1974 births
Living people
People from Orikhiv
Ukrainian footballers
Association football goalkeepers
FC Mariupol players
FC Metalurh Zaporizhzhia players
FC Torpedo Zaporizhzhia players
FC Zirka Kropyvnytskyi players
FC Zirka-2 Kirovohrad players
FC Metalurh-2 Zaporizhzhia players
SSSOR Metalurh Zaporizhzhia players
Ukrainian football managers
Ukrainian expatriate football managers
Expatriate football managers in Azerbaijan
Ukrainian expatriate sportspeople in Azerbaijan
Expatriate football managers in Kazakhstan
Ukrainian expatriate sportspeople in Kazakhstan
Sportspeople from Zaporizhzhia Oblast